Z. Ritchie House is a historic home located at Plattsburgh in Clinton County, New York.  It was built between 1856 and 1869 and is a two-story, frame dwelling on a stone foundation in the Gothic Revival style.  It features a cross-gable roof, decorative bargeboards, and a one-story projecting bay with ornate balustrade.

It was listed on the National Register of Historic Places in 1982.

References

Houses on the National Register of Historic Places in New York (state)
Gothic Revival architecture in New York (state)
Houses completed in 1869
Houses in Clinton County, New York
1869 establishments in New York (state)
National Register of Historic Places in Clinton County, New York